The Wakoklon Heelel Thilen Salai Amailon Pukok Puya, shortly known as the Wakoklon, is one of the oldest scriptures (puyas) in Sanamahism, the Meetei religion of Ancient Kangleipak (Antique Manipur). It is verified that it was written in 1398 BC (3400 years ago) by the National Archives, New Delhi. The text is considered by the people and the Government of Manipur as the source of the Kanglei Eeyek (Meetei script). The Wakoklon recommends only 18 letters to be used in the Meetei writing system. One of the most important lines written in the text is "Konsen Tuleisengpa Sana Ee Mahi". The text also mentions about the ancestral rituals to please the deities.

References

Other websites 

 The North Eastern Geographer, Volume 12 books.google.co.in
 Concepts of some important words used in Puya Wakoklon Heelel Thilel Salai Ama-ilon Pukok www.e-pao.net
 The Puya – Wakoklon Heelel Thilel Salai Ama-ilon Pukok And Modern Science www.e-pao.net
 The Puya – Wakoklon Heelel Thilel Salai Ama-ilon Pukok And Modern Science :: Part 2 www.e-pao.net
 Extra-terrestrial Connection of the Meeteis: Part 2 A Study of Wakoklon Heelel Thilel Salai Amailon Pukok Puya www.e-pao.net
 Extra-terrestrial Connection of the Meeteis: Part 3 A Study of Wakoklon Heelel Thilel Salai Amailon Pukok Puya www.e-pao.net
Sanamahism
Pages with unreviewed translations
Puyas
Meitei script